This is a list of members of the fifth parliament of the South Australian House of Assembly, which sat from 31 July 1868 until 2 March 1870. The members were elected at the 1868 colonial election.

 John Cheriton and William Rogers were initially declared elected as the two members for Mount Barker, but their election was challenged and they were unseated on 11 August 1868. Cheriton was re-elected in the resulting by-election on 3 September, but Rogers was defeated by John Dunn. Dunn's election was then challenged, and his election was voided on 9 October. Rogers then won a second by-election on 5 November.
 The Sturt MHA Richard Andrews resigned on 18 January 1870. Frederick Spicer won the resulting by-election on 10 February.
 The seat of West Torrens MHA was declared vacant on 20 January 1870 due to George Bean's non-attendance. John Pickering won the resulting by-election on 10 February.

References
Statistical Record of the Legislature 1836-2007, Parliament of SA, www.parliament.sa.gov.au

Members of South Australian parliaments by term
19th-century Australian politicians